Josh Honey (born 17 October 2001) is an Australian rules footballer who plays for the Carlton Football Club in the Australian Football League (AFL).

Early football
Honey played in Division 1 for the Keilor Football Club in the Essendon District Football League. After a strong performance for Keilor, he was selected to play for the Western Jets in the NAB League. He played 26 games, kicked 32 goals and averaged 13.5 disposals over his two seasons. He represented Vic Metro in the AFL Under 18 Championships in the 2019 season, where he played two games, kicked two goals and averaged 9.5 disposals.

AFL career
Honey was recruited by the Carlton Football Club with the 3rd draft pick in the 2020 AFL rookie draft. He made his debut in 's after the siren four point win against  in Round 12, 2020, kicking one behind and collecting four disposals in his only match of the season. He played five senior matches in 2021, and was subsequently elevated to the club's senior list from 2022.

Statistics
 Statistics are correct to the end of 2021

|- style="background-color: #EAEAEA"
! scope="row" style="text-align:center" | 2020
|style="text-align:center;"|
| 36 || 1 || 0 || 1 || 3 || 1 || 4 || 2 || 1 || 0.0 || 1.0 || 3.0 || 1.0 || 4.0 || 2.0 || 1.0
|- style="background:#EAEAEA;
! scope="row" style="text-align:center" | 2021
|style="text-align:center;"|
| 36 || 5 || 6 || 3 || 24 || 12 || 36 || 13 || 6 || 1.2 || 0.6 || 4.8 || 2.4 || 7.2 || 2.6 || 1.2
|- style="background:#EAEAEA; 
 font-weight:bold; width:2em"
| scope="row" text-align:center class="sortbottom" colspan=3 | Career
| 6
| 6
| 4
| 27
| 13
| 40
| 15
| 7
| 1.0
| 0.6
| 4.5
| 2.1
| 6.6
| 2.5
| 1.1
|}

References

External links

2001 births
Living people
Australian rules footballers from Melbourne
Western Jets players
Carlton Football Club players